John Marks Templeton Jr. (February 19, 1940 – May 16, 2015), also known as Jack Templeton, was an American physician. The elder son of Judith (née Folk) Templeton and investor, businessman and philanthropist Sir John Templeton, Jack Templeton served as the Chairman and President of the John Templeton Foundation.

He was born in New York City and graduated from Yale University, where he was a member of Elihu senior society, as was his father. He later earned a medical degree at Harvard Medical School, and then served as a physician in the U.S. Navy. In 1977, he went to work at the Children's Hospital of Philadelphia as a pediatric surgeon and trauma program director.  His wife Josephine was a pediatric anesthesiologist at the same hospital.

He retired in 1995, as chief of pediatric surgery at Children's Hospital of Philadelphia to join the John Templeton Foundation and took over the leadership when his father died in 2008.

Templeton was an evangelical Christian. The Templeton Honors College at Eastern University is named in his honor. He was a substantial contributor to conservative causes. In 2008, he donated $450,000 to the National Organization for Marriage, and his wife, Josephine, contributed $100,000. In 2009, he donated $300,000, again to the National Organization For Marriage. In a Philadelphia Inquirer article it was asserted that the Templetons had, between John and his wife, Josephine, donated $1 million to parties opposing same-sex marriage.

In 2010, Politics Magazine had named Templeton as one of the most influential Republicans in Pennsylvania.

Templeton died on May 16, 2015, from brain cancer in Bryn Mawr, Pennsylvania. Survivors include his wife, Josephine (Pina) Gargiulo Templeton, whom he married in 1970; two daughters, Heather Dill and Jennifer Simpson; a brother; and six grandchildren.

References

External links
 Templeton Foundation profile

1940 births
2015 deaths
American evangelicals
American pediatric surgeons
Deaths from brain cancer in the United States
Deaths from cancer in Pennsylvania
Harvard Medical School alumni
Pennsylvania Republicans
People from Haverford Township, Pennsylvania
Yale University alumni
Foreign Policy Research Institute
George School alumni
20th-century American philanthropists